Weston-sub-Edge railway station is a disused station on the Honeybourne Line from  to Cheltenham which served the village of Weston-sub-Edge in Gloucestershire between 1904 and 1960.

History 
The OW&W became the West Midland Railway in 1860 and was acquired by Great Western Railway in 1883 with a view to combining it with the Birmingham to Stratford Line to create a high-speed route from the Midlands to the South West. The GWR obtained authorisation in 1899 for the construction of a double-track line between Honeybourne and Cheltenham and this was completed in stages by 1908.

As the first station on the new line, Weston-sub-Edge was opened on 1 August 1904. It was located immediately to the north of the bridge carrying the B4035 road over the line from which a footpath led down to the 'Up' platform. The  platforms were equipped with the usual lamps, nameboards and fencing. A 27-lever signal box was provided on the 'Up' side to the south of the platform and it controlled a siding capable of holding 15 wagons, as well as access to the small goods yard, equipped with a small goods shed, 6-ton crane and weighbridge, which handled mainly agricultural and, in particular, meat for use in the production of animal glue. Average tonnage handled was around 3,000 tons a year in the 1920s, which began to fall off in the 1930s before picking up again in the Second World War when it reached a peak of 15,366 in 1941. The principal generator of wartime traffic was the airfield established to the north-west of the station behind the signalbox; the airfield was known as Honeybourne and its personnel used the station.

A stationmaster's house was located adjacent to the goods yard on the 'Down' side, although Weston-sub-Edge only had a stationmaster until 1932 after which the station came under the control of the  stationmaster. Adjoining the house was accommodation for other staff: a ganger and platelayer. The goods yard closed on 25 September 1950, followed soon after by the signalbox on 8 October 1950. From this point, the station became a large unstaffed halt until its closure on 7 March 1960 with the withdrawal of local passenger trains on the line.

Present and future
Little trace remains of Weston-sub-Edge station.

The Gloucestershire Warwickshire Railway aims to reopen the line through Weston-sub-Edge as part of an extension of its line to Honeybourne. This might even include rebuilding and reopening the station site itself, once fundraising and support from locals nearby is obtained.

References

Sources

 
 
 

 

Railway stations in Great Britain opened in 1904
Railway stations in Great Britain closed in 1960
Disused railway stations in Gloucestershire
Former Great Western Railway stations